Kaithi Kannayiram is a 1960 Indian Tamil-language crime film, written and directed by A. S. A. Sami. Produced by T. R. Sundaram of Modern Theatres, the film stars R. S. Manohar and Rajasulochana. A remake of the 1959 Hindi film Qaidi No. 911, it revolves around a man who is arrested for a robbery he never committed. The film was released on 1 December 1960 and became a commercial success.

Plot 

A jailor's son named Kumaran is kidnapped by a vengeful murderous prisoner. Another prisoner who has lost his child escapes from the prison. He takes up the task of rescuing the jailor's missing son. The duty-conscious jailor is only keen on apprehending him. The child is taught music by a teacher and the song, "Konji Konji Pesi", becomes the link for the rescue of the child kept prisoner in a building. Unable to locate the child who is held captive, the music teacher goes around the town singing the song. On hearing the song, the child emerges from his hideout and utters the lines outwitting the guards. The child is rescued after a long fight between the two prisoners.

Cast 
 R. S. Manohar as Kannayiram or prisoner no: 101
 P. S. Veerappa as Jagatheeran or no:420
 Rajasulochana as Pattammal music teacher
 K. A. Thangavelu as Singaram or No:55
 E. V. Saroja as Madhavi
 Seetharaman as Jailor
 Master Sridhar as Ravi, Kannayiram's kid
 ‘Baby' Savithiri as Kumaran, Jailor's kid
 Kallapart Natarajan as Inspector Anand
 ‘Socrates' Thangaraj
 'Kambar' Jayaraman as Sethu
 'Periyar' Rajavelu [Rajavelan]

Soundtrack 
The soundtrack album was composed by K. V. Mahadevan. The lyrics were written by A. Maruthakasi. The song "Konji Konji Pesi" is based on "Meethi Meethi Baaton Se" from the Hindi original.

Release and reception 
Kaithi Kannayiram was released on 1 December 1960, and fared well at the box office.

References

External links 
 

1960 crime films
1960 films
1960s Tamil-language films
Films scored by K. V. Mahadevan
Indian crime films
Tamil remakes of Hindi films